Jamestown GAA was a Gaelic football club in Jamestown, County Laois, Republic of Ireland.  The area now forms part of the catchment area of Courtwood GAA Club.

Andy Whelan, Stephen "Faun" Hughes and John Lalor were all Jamestown players who played in Laois's Leinster Senior Football Championship win of 1946.

Jamestown won three Laois Junior Football Championships in 1938, 1948 and 1953 and one Laois Intermediate Football Championship in 1941.

Following the formation of Courtwood club, the Jamestown club faded out of existence in the 1960s.

References
Jamestown archives

Former Gaelic Athletic Association clubs in County Laois